My or MY may refer to:

Arts and entertainment 

 My (radio station), a Malaysian radio station
 Little My, a fictional character in the Moomins universe
 My (album), by Edyta Górniak
 My (EP), by Cho Mi-yeon

Business  
 Marketing year, variable period
 Model year, product identifier

Transport 
 Motoryacht
 Motor Yacht, a name prefix for merchant vessels
 Midwest Airlines (Egypt), IATA airline designation
 MAXjet Airways, United States, defunct IATA airline designation

Other uses 
 My, the genitive form of the English pronoun I
 Malaysia, ISO 3166-1 country code
 .my, the country-code top level domain (ccTLD)
 Burmese language (ISO 639 alpha-2)
 Megalithic Yard, a hypothesised, prehistoric unit of length
 Million years

See also 
 MyTV (disambiguation)
 µ ("mu"), a letter of the Greek alphabet
 Mi (disambiguation)
 Me (disambiguation)
 Myself (disambiguation)